The Tullahoma-Manchester Micropolitan Statistical Area, as defined by the United States Census Bureau, is an area consisting of three counties in central Tennessee, anchored by the cities of Tullahoma and Manchester.

As of the 2000 census, the μSA had a population of 93,024 (though a July 1, 2009 estimate placed the population at 99,927).

Counties
Coffee
Franklin
Moore

Communities

Places with 10,000 to 21,000 inhabitants
Manchester (county seat)
Tullahoma

Places with 1,000 to 10,000 inhabitants
Cowan
Decherd
Estill Springs
Lynchburg (county seat)
New Union (census-designated place)
Monteagle (partial)
Sewanee (census-designated place)
Winchester (county seat)

Places with less than 1,000 inhabitants
Hillsboro (Census-designated place)
Huntland
Lakewood Park (Census-designated place)

Unincorporated communities
Belvidere
Sherwood

Demographics
As of the census of 2000, there were 93,024 people, 36,099 households, and 26,445 families residing within the μSA. The racial makeup of the μSA was 93.06% White, 4.34% African American, 0.25% Native American, 0.56% Asian, 0.03% Pacific Islander, 0.76% from other races, and 1.00% from two or more races. Hispanic or Latino of any race were 1.84% of the population.

The median income for a household in the μSA was $35,844, and the median income for a family was $41,330. Males had a median income of $31,932 versus $21,160 for females. The per capita income for the μSA was $18,388.

See also
Tennessee census statistical areas

References

 
Geography of Coffee County, Tennessee
Geography of Franklin County, Tennessee
Geography of Moore County, Tennessee